TRT EBA TV is a Turkish world educational television network, owned by state broadcaster TRT. It was launched on 20 March 2020 as a test broadcast and was officially launched on 23 March 2020. The channel was founded following the impact of the COVID-19 pandemic in Turkey which resulted in all schools moving to distance learning on 16 March. The channel focuses on education and broadcasts school lessons for primary, secondary and high school students through separate channels, which are supported by the digital Eğitim Bilişim Ağı (EBA) system.

The channel is free-to-air and available on Türksat, as well as the Digitürk, D-Smart, Cable TV and Tivibu digital broadcasting platforms.

External links 

 Official EBA Website 
 Watch TRT EBA TV Primary School live Online
 Watch TRT EBA TV Secondary School live Online
 Watch TRT EBA TV High School live Online
 TRT EBA TV İlkokul at LyngSat
 TRT EBA TV Ortaokul at LyngSat
 TRT EBA TV Lise at LyngSat

References 

Television stations in Turkey
Turkish-language television stations
Television channels and stations established in 2020
2020 establishments in Turkey
Turkish Radio and Television Corporation